Hu Jia (born July 25, 1973, in Beijing) is a Chinese civil rights activist and noted critic of Chinese Communist Party. His work has focused on the Chinese democracy movement, Chinese environmentalist movement, and HIV/AIDS in the People's Republic of China. Hu is the director of June Fourth Heritage & Culture Association, and he has been involved with AIDS advocacy as the executive director of the Beijing Aizhixing Institute of Health Education and as one of the founders of the non-governmental organization Loving Source.  He has also been involved in work to protect the endangered Tibetan antelope.  For his activism, Hu has received awards from  several European bodies, such as the Paris City Council and the European Parliament, which awarded the Sakharov Prize for Freedom of Thought to him in December 2008.

On December 27, 2007, Hu was detained as part of a crackdown on dissents during the Christmas holiday season. Reporters Without Borders said that "The political police have taken advantage of the international community's focus on Pakistan to arrest one of the foremost representatives of the peaceful struggle for free expression in China."  The decision to take him into custody was made after peasant leaders in several Chinese provinces issued a manifesto demanding broader land rights for peasants whose property had been confiscated for development. On April 3, 2008, he was sentenced to 3.5 years in jail. Hu pleaded not guilty on charges of "inciting subversion of state power" at his trial in March 2008. His trial and detention garnered international attention, and Hu was described as a political prisoner, and was designated a prisoner of conscience by Amnesty International. He was released on June 26, 2011.

Biography
Hu's parents were students at Tsinghua University in Beijing and Nankai University in Tianjin in 1957 when they were labeled as rightists during the Anti-Rightist Movement under Mao Zedong. They were assigned to work in remote provinces of Hebei, Gansu, and Hunan. His parents often had to live apart until 1978, when Deng Xiaoping came to power and political label held against them was dropped.

In 1996 Hu graduated from the Beijing School of Economics (now Capital University of Economics and Trade, 首都经济贸易大学), where he majored in information engineering.

In January 2006 Hu married Zeng Jinyan, with whom he has a daughter. Zeng was included in Time magazine's 100 Heroes and Pioneers for her blogging after his arrest in February 2008 for voicing his indignation at China as the host of the 2008 Summer Olympics. Both his wife and daughter were held in house arrest and harassed by the Ministry of State Security, and disappeared one day before the opening ceremony in Beijing.

Hu is a Buddhist of the Tibetan tradition and began to practice Buddhism after the student uprisings.

Activism 

Hu became interested in environmental issues while in university and participated in several environmental organizations including the Friends of Nature, led by Liang Congjie, and the 1997 Green Camp university student environmental camp led by Tang Xiyang. In 1998 Hu Jia was involved in rescuing some wild elk that were threatened by severe flooding that year. Hu was subsequently involved in efforts to protect the Tibetan Antelope that were being slaughtered for their fur.

In July 2000, the writer Wang Lixiong introduced Hu to AIDS activist Wan Yanhai. Afterwards Hu Jia became involved in AIDS prevention work and took an active part in the AIZIBING Institute of Health Education AIDS, which Wan Yanhai had founded.  As one of the founders Loving Source a non-governmental organization and advocacy group for individuals with AIDS, Hu Jia has been involved in helping people suffering from AIDS and AIDS orphans in Henan province. He has criticized the government over its treatment of people with AIDS.  According to Amnesty International, Hu has since resigned from Loving Source to prevent the authorities from harassing the group.

Hu has also been involved in campaigns to release political prisoners, including Wan Yanhai in August–September 2002 and the cyber-dissident Liu Di ("The Stainless Steel Rat"). In 2003, Hu Jia lodged a letter of complaint to the European Court of Human Rights over German Chancellor Gerhard Schroeder's refusal to meet with the Dalai Lama.  In 2005 he participated in anti-Japanese demonstrations.

Hu insists on his rights as a citizen of the People's Republic in China. When police detain him (often for planned activities and sometimes to ensure that he is not active at sensitive times such as June 4, the  anniversary of the Tiananmen Square protests of 1989) Hu demands that the police state what provision of Chinese law he is being held under. Hu says that the security officers are generally unable to do so.

In 2006, Beijing Zhiaixing Information Counseling Center (formerly called Aizhixing Institute of Health Education), a human rights advocacy group with which Hu was affiliated, received combined grant of $179,113 from National Endowment for Democracy and US State Department for conducting programs within China.

On February 16, 2006, Hu was detained for 41 days. His detention was not acknowledged by the Chinese government. After his return to his apartment in Beijing, where he lives with his wife Zeng Jinyan (also an AIDS activist), Hu Jia was kept under house arrest until March 2007. Two months later, on May 18, 2007, Hu Jia and his wife were placed under house arrest again on charges of "harming state security". Hu Jia has remained active via emails and blogs while under house arrests.

Using a web camera, Hu participated in a European parliamentary hearing in Brussels in November 2007 about human rights in China. At the hearing he said: "It is ironic that one of the people in charge of organizing the Olympic Games is the head of the Bureau of Public Security, which is responsible for so many human rights violations. It is very serious that the official promises are not being kept before the games."

Imprisonment

On December 30, 2007, Hu was arrested at his home in Beijing by the Chinese police for "inciting subversion of state authority". His trial began in March 2008 on charges of "inciting subversion of state power and the socialist system", stemming from interviews he gave to the foreign media and political articles he wrote and published on the internet. The crime carries a maximum sentence of five years in prison. On April 3, 2008, Hu was sentenced to three years and six months in prison.  Hu's wife Zeng Jinyan, after an April 2009 prison visit with Hu Jia, noted that his health is deteriorating because of inadequate nutrition and medical care. He is thought to be suffering from a liver condition.

Hu was released from custody on June 26, 2011.

Illness

In April 2010, Hu's family got to know that he was sent to prison hospital for medical check of symptoms suspected to be liver cancer but no information of the medical report was released to his family.  Hu's wife Ms Zeng requested for the detailed medical report but was denied access.  She and Hu's mother requested for medical parole but the prison administration rejected by saying that Hu's disease is not liver cancer, and he might not be released for medical care even if he had liver cancer.

On April 7, Ms Zeng published an open letter on Internet, requesting medical parole of Mr. Hu.  Shortly later, Ms Ai Xiaoming and Ms Cui Weiping, two renowned university professors who are also active in human rights activities, published an open letter on Internet, appealing public support for Ms Zeng's request of medical parole of Mr. Hu.  In less than 10 days, over 700 people endorsed the open letter through email and web forms.

On December 5, 2014, notable CCP member Zhou Yongkang was expelled from the party after being accused of alleged corruption in the course of the Anti-corruption campaign under Xi Jinping. The following day, Hu commented on the recent anti-corruption campaign of the CCP stating "Zhou challenged Xi's authority and threatened his rule - that's why he's now being held responsible along with his gangs. The bottom line is: All officials are corrupt. Xi can't find a better excuse to rid of his political opponents than fighting corruption - something that helps him win the masses' hearts and minds."

Awards and honors 
Hu was made an honorary citizen of Paris on April 21, 2008, the same day as was the 14th Dalai Lama. On October 23, 2008, the European Parliament announced that its Sakharov Prize for Freedom of Thought would be awarded to Hu Jia in December 2008.

See also 
 Human rights in the People's Republic of China

References

External links

The Year of the Dog - A Chinese activist's story 
Chinese AIDS activist missing for six weeks returns home
Interview With AIDS Activist Hu Jia
Hu Jia's blog, translated by Google Translate.
Hu Jia's Live Spaces blog in Chinese
Friends of Nature website (in Chinese)
Prisoners in Freedom City, a documentary by Hu Jia and Zeng Jinyan (with Chinese and English Subtitles)
The full documentary, "Prisoners of Freedom City" on the WITNESS Hub - Part 1, Part 2 & Part 3
Hu Jia Arrest Indicates China Anxiety over Tibet Issue
Video: Living under house arrest in Beijing

1973 births
HIV/AIDS activists
Amnesty International prisoners of conscience held by China
Chinese democracy activists
Chinese dissidents
Chinese environmentalists
Chinese prisoners and detainees
Living people
People from Beijing
Tibetan Buddhists from China
Weiquan movement
People's Republic of China Tibetan Buddhists
Converts to Buddhism
Sakharov Prize laureates
Honorary citizens of Paris
Chinese political prisoners